This is the list of Asian Games records in archery.

Recurve

Men

Women

Mixed

Compound

Men

Women

Mixed

References 
 2010 Asian Games Archery Results Book

External links 
 Asian Games – Games Records

Records
Archery
Asian Games